Al-Sads and Bani Atta is a sub-district located in Manakhah District, Sana'a Governorate, Yemen. Al-Sads and Bani Atta had a population of 1962 according to the 2004 census.

References 

Sub-districts in Manakhah District